Catedral Basílica de Mercedes-Luján ("Cathedral Basilica of Our Lady of Mercy") is the cathedral of the Roman Catholic Archdiocese of Mercedes-Luján and a minor basilica in Mercedes, Buenos Aires Province, Argentina. It serves the Archdiocese of Mercedes-Luján and houses the Episcopal Chair. Built in 1904 in Gothic Revival style. It contains the remains of Don Saturnino Unzué and Doña Inés Unzué Dorrego, its main benefactors. On 15 April 2010, the building was declared a National Historic Landmark under Decree 492/2010.

This cathedral is dedicated to Our Lady of Mercy. It should not be confused with the Basilica of Our Lady of Luján, a much bigger and famous temple which is located in the same diocese.

References

External links

Mercedes, Buenos Aires
Roman Catholic churches completed in 1904
20th-century Roman Catholic church buildings in Argentina
Roman Catholic cathedrals in Buenos Aires Province